Aventure en Australie, written by Tome and drawn by Janry, is the thirty-fourth album of the Spirou et Fantasio series, and the second of the authors. The story was initially serialised in Spirou magazine, before released as a hardcover album in 1985.

Story

In Adventure in Australia, the Count of Champignac, accompanied by a young professor, Walker Donahue, thinks he has made an extraordinary discovery in Australia, namely an immense indigenous monolith in the surroundings of a mining village. He asks Spirou and Fantasio to join them. Thus, the two go to the Australia, accompanied by Seccotine, which was essential. When they arrive, Donahue informs them that the Count was killed by miners. After investigation, they discover that the Count did not die but the heroes find him in bad shape, face to face with Sam, a gangster who grows rich by holding prospectors to ransom. Sam ends up dying when his truck explodes because of a bottle of nitroglycerin. Thanks to the aboriginals, of which they were allies, Spirou, Donahue and the Count put in rout Sam's men who are trying to eliminate Fantasio and Seccotine. Finally, the monolith is discovered and the aboriginals make an agreement to share resources with the prospectors, who are grateful to them for getting rid of Sam.

Film Adaption

Adventure in Australia was made into an episode of the animated Spirou et Fantasio TV series.

References

 Tome publications in Spirou and Janry publications in Spirou BDoubliées

External links
Official site Spirou albums 

Spirou et Fantasio albums
Works originally published in Spirou (magazine)
Literature first published in serial form
1985 books
1985 in comics
Comics set in Australia